Jade is a 1995 American erotic thriller film written by Joe Eszterhas, produced by Robert Evans, directed by William Friedkin, and starring David Caruso, Linda Fiorentino, Chazz Palminteri, Richard Crenna, and Michael Biehn. The original music score was composed by James Horner based on a song composed by Loreena McKennitt. The film was marketed with the tagline "Some fantasies go too far."

Plot
Assistant District Attorney David Corelli (Caruso) is called to the murder scene of prominent businessman Kyle Medford, found bludgeoned to death in his San Francisco home by an antique hatchet. Police detectives Bob Hargrove and Petey Vesko find photographs in Medford's safe of Governor Lew Edwards (Crenna) having sex with a prostitute, later identified as Patrice Jacinto. During questioning, Patrice reveals that she and several other women were paid by Medford to have sex with wealthy men at his beach house in Pacifica. She also informs them that the most desired prostitute among the clients was a woman known only as "Jade". In a private meeting with Governor Edwards and aide Bill Barrett, Corelli is warned not to make the photographs public. Corelli is then almost killed when his brake line is deliberately cut and his vehicle goes out of control while driving down a steep hill.

The detectives find fingerprints on the hatchet belonging to Katrina Gavin, a clinical psychologist and former lover of Corelli's who eventually married his close friend, defense attorney Matt Gavin. When interviewed, Katrina explains that Medford gave her a tour of his antique collection on the day in question, but claims to have nothing to do with his death. At Medford's beach house, Corelli and the detectives find various drugs, alcohol, and sex toys, as well as hidden video cameras. They conclude Medford was recording the sex sessions to blackmail the men. Corelli is shocked to discover Katrina on one of the tapes; the revelation renews the detectives' interest in her as a suspect.

Patrice arranges to meet Corelli at a restaurant to discuss Jade's identity, but she is murdered in a hit-and-run attack by an unknown assailant driving a black Ford Thunderbird. Corelli, witnessing the murder first-hand, chases the assailants' vehicle in vain. The detectives discover the Gavins own a similar Thunderbird, so suspect Katrina of killing Patrice, but then find the actual vehicle used in the hit-and-run abandoned, suggesting that someone is trying to frame Katrina. Katrina is again brought in for questioning and is shown the sex tape. Matt, in his capacity as her attorney, ends the interrogation before she fully explains her involvement. When confronted at their home, Katrina admits to her husband that she did have sex with the man on the tape, due in part to her knowledge of Matt's many affairs.

Katrina visits Corelli at his apartment and tries unsuccessfully to seduce him. She admits having felt sexually liberated by sleeping with several men at the beach house. Meanwhile, the only witness to identify Katrina at the Pacifica beach house, a man named Henderson, is found murdered. Corelli informs the detectives at the crime scene that Katrina could not have killed him because he was with her at the time. Back at his apartment, Corelli is confronted by Matt, who holds him at gunpoint and angrily accuses him of sleeping with Katrina. Corelli denies it and persuades Matt that his wife's life is in danger. They hurry to the Gavin home, where Det. Hargrove, Barrett, and Pat Callendar have come to kill Katrina and search for the incriminating photos of the governor. Callendar is shot by Matt, but Barrett manages to escape. In the meantime, Hargrove tries to rape and kill Katrina, but Corelli and Matt arrive and Hargrove is shot by Matt.

Corelli goes to the governor for a guarantee of Katrina's safety by leveraging his possession of the photographs. The governor denies any knowledge of Hargrove or Callendar's actions, but insinuates they were both acting on his behalf. As she gets ready for bed at home, Katrina finds photographs laid out in her bathroom of her having sex at the beach house. Matt admits to Katrina that he killed Medford, certain that Medford eventually would blackmail them both. He then tells Katrina to "introduce me to Jade" the next time they "make love".

Cast

Production
Warren Beatty was the first choice to play the role of David Corelli, but turned it down. After his sudden departure from NYPD Blue, David Caruso was hoping to break through with a film career and accepted the role. The part of Matt Gavin was offered to Kenneth Branagh, before Chazz Palminteri was eventually cast. Julia Roberts and Sharon Stone were considered to play Katrina Gavin, but both rejected it. Linda Fiorentino was then asked, but she originally turned it down because she did not want to play a prostitute, but changed her mind once her character was changed through rewrites.

According to Joe Eszterhas' autobiography, Hollywood Animal, William Friedkin changed the script so much that Eszterhas threatened to remove his name from the credits. He claimed Paramount settled by giving him a "blind script deal" worth $2–4 million.

In an interview in Linda Ruth Williams' book The Erotic Thriller in Contemporary Cinema, Friedkin admitted that he had virtually rewritten the script. Friedkin also said that Jade was the favorite of all the films he had made. He later wrote the movie had "a terrific cast. A wonderful script. Great locations. How could it miss?"

Release

A year prior to the film's release, Caruso decided that his popularity as star of the hit ABC TV series NYPD Blue would provide enough momentum to successfully make the risky jump from television to feature-film leading man. Although he did play an assistant district attorney, this film was a departure from his more heroic role on TV.

Despite a large marketing campaign, moviegoers did not seem to accept Caruso in this character, or the dark and overtly sexual themes of the film.

Comeback roles in television failed until he landed the lead role in CBS' 2002 spin-off series, CSI: Miami.

Reception

Box office
The film, with an estimated production budget of $50 million, earned $9,851,610 at the North American domestic box office, taking in $4,284,246 in its opening weekend and ranking number five in the box-office charts.

Critical response
The film received negative reviews from critics. Rotten Tomatoes retrospectively collected 30 reviews and gave the film an approval score of 13%, with an average rating of 4.2/10. The site's consensus reads: "An ostensible erotic thriller that's largely neither erotic nor thrilling, Jade marks one of several unfortunate low points for aggressively sexual mid-'90s cinema". On Metacritic it has a score of 33% based on reviews from 27 critics, indicating "generally unfavorable reviews". Audiences polled by CinemaScore gave the film an average grade of "C+" on an A+ to F scale. Gene Siskel singled the film out as the worst one he saw in 1995.

Roger Ebert of the Chicago Sun-Times responded to Siskel's worst-of selection by mounting a very mild defense where he said that he didn't think the movie was amongst the worst of 1995, although he added that he gave it a thumbs-down grade on their show and said that the plot was incomprehensible; in his print review, Ebert awarded it 2 out of 4 stars, and wrote: "There's only one character we can identify with - a San Francisco police detective played by David Caruso - and he doesn't drive the plot so much as get swept along by it."
Brian Lowry of Variety called it "A muddled mix of sex, political corruption and murder, Jade is a jigsaw puzzle that never puts all the pieces together."
Janet Maslin of The New York Times wrote: "Though the combination of Linda Fiorentino, Chazz Palminteri and David Caruso promised Jade some fire, it winds up with no more spark than a doused campfire."

Awards

It earned two Golden Raspberry Award nominations, for Worst Screenplay and Worst New Star (for Caruso, who was nominated for both Jade and Kiss of Death), but lost both categories to Showgirls, also written by Joe Eszterhas.

Other response
Friedkin admitted the film was "a critical and financial disaster", although it "contained some of my best work. I felt I had let down the actors, the studio, and most of all, Sherry (Sherry Lansing, his wife, an executive at Paramount). I went into a deep funk. Was it the Exorcist curse, as many have suggested, a poor choice of material, or simply that whatever talent I had was ephemeral? Maybe all of the above."

Michael Biehn was not fond of the film: "Well, on Jade, I had no idea what I was doing. I don't think anybody had any idea what they were doing. It was a Joe Eszterhas script. To me, none of it ever really made any sense. I didn't realize until the read-through that I was the bad guy in it. It was like a jumbled mess. And the movie came out a mess, too. It had great people on it, though. It had William Friedkin directing, it had Chazz Palmenteri, who was nominated that year for an Academy Award, it had Linda Fiorentino, who had just come out with that famous movie she did The Last Seduction, and it had David Caruso, who's a brilliant actor when given the right material, and a very smart guy. So a great cast, great director... everything but a script."

Director's cut

An unrated "director's cut" version featuring additional scenes and more explicit sexual footage with an additional 12 minutes was later released to VHS, though it is now out of print; the theatrical cut was used for the subsequent DVD and Blu-ray editions. The planned unrated versions for DVD, LaserDisc, and Blu-ray were cancelled, due to poor sales of the unrated VHS version.

In one alternate version of Jade, rather than having Gavin get away with murder, Corelli returns to the house, clearly planning to place him under arrest.

Cable channels USA, Cinemax, and WGN air the director's cut, including some scenes originally cut to avoid a possible NC-17 rating and for length.

References

Further reading
 Friedkin, William, The Friedkin Connection, Harper Collins 2013

External links
 
 
 

1995 films
1995 crime thriller films
1990s erotic thriller films
American crime thriller films
1990s English-language films
Films directed by William Friedkin
Films with screenplays by Joe Eszterhas
American erotic thriller films
Films about prostitution in the United States
Films set in San Francisco
Films shot in California
Films shot in Los Angeles
Films shot in San Francisco
American police detective films
Paramount Pictures films
Films scored by James Horner
Films produced by Robert Evans
1990s American films
Works about prosecutors